The United States sent a delegation to compete at the 2008 Summer Paralympics in Beijing, China. A total of 213 U.S. competitors took part in 18 sports; the only 2 sports Americans did not compete in were soccer 5-a-side and 7-a-side. The American delegation included 16 former members of the U.S. military, including 3 veterans of the Iraq War. Among them were shot putter Scott Winkler, who was paralyzed in an accident in Iraq, and swimmer Melissa Stockwell, a former United States Army officer who lost her left leg to a roadside bomb in the war.

The United States finished third in the gold and overall medal count, behind host nation China and Great Britain. The finish was an improvement from the 2004 Paralympics, where the U.S. finished fourth in the gold and overall medal count. The U.S. saw significant gains in Paralympic swimming, winning 17 gold medals and 44 total medals, 9 more than they took home from Athens. U.S. swimmers set a total of 16 world records, 23 Paralympic records, 48 Pan American records and 99 American records. U.S. coverage of the Games was provided by the Universal Sports Television Network and the official website of the U.S. Paralympic Team.

Disability classifications
Every participant at the Paralympics had their disability grouped into one of five disability categories: amputation (either congenital or sustained through injury or illness); cerebral palsy; wheelchair athletes (often overlapping with other categories); visual impairment (including blindness); and les autres (any physical disability that does not fall strictly under one of the other categories, for example dwarfism or multiple sclerosis). Each Paralympic sport then had its own classifications, depending on the specific physical demands of the competition. Events were given a code, made of numbers and letters, describing the type of event and classification of the athletes competing. Some sports, such as athletics, divided athletes by both the category and severity of their disabilities. Other sports, such as swimming, grouped competitors from different categories together, the only separation being based on the severity of the disability.

Athletes may have competed against individuals with different classifications in the same event. For example, track and field athlete Jim Bob Bizzell competed in the men's 200 meters T44; the prefix T designated a track event and 44 was the disability classification. Although he finished behind Oscar Pistorius (competing under the T43 class), Bizell set a world record in the T44 classification. For specific classification information, see the pages for individual sports at 2008 Summer Paralympics#Sports.

Medalists

The following American athletes won medals at the games; all dates are for September 2008. In the 'by discipline' sections below, medalists' names are in bold.

| width="78%" align="left" valign="top" |

| width="22%" align="left" valign="top" |

Archery 

The American archery team consisted of seven men and one woman. The highest placed finishers were Lindsey Carmichael and Jeff Fabry, who each won a bronze medal. T. J. Pemberton and Joe Bailey competed against each other in the quarterfinals of the men's individual compound open, with Pemberton winning and going on to finish fourth in that event.

Track and field (athletics) 

The American track and field team consisted of 26 men and 17 women. Among them was shot putter Scott Winkler, a U.S. Army veteran who was paralyzed in Tikrit, Iraq in 2003 after he fell off a truck while holding 50 pounds of ammunition. The team set six world records and won a total of nine gold, fourteen silver, and five bronze medals, two more medals than the team won in Athens. Jessica Galli won five medals, more than any other team member, while Amanda McGrory, Tatyana McFadden, and Jim Bob Bizzell each won at least three medals. Jeremy Campbell was the only U.S. track and field athlete to win two golds.

Men

Legend: Q – Qualifiers for the final as decided on a basis of rank within heat; WR=World Record; PR=Paralympic Record

Women

Legend: Q – Qualifiers for the final as decided on a basis of rank within heat; WR=World Record; PR=Paralympic Record

Boccia 

The U.S. boccia team consisted of a single competitor, T. J. Hawker. Hawker lost his four pool stage matches and did not advance to the knock-out stage.

Cycling 

The initial members of the 2008 U.S. Paralympic Cycling Team were named on June 6, 2008, after the 2008 U.S. Paralympics Cycling National Championships in Morrison, Colorado. The final roster included thirteen athletes (seven men and six women). The team entered the Games with a goal of two gold and ten medals total. They surpassed their goal, finishing with fourteen medals: five gold, five silver, and four bronze.

Factor time
To ensure a fair event when athletes with differing disabilities compete, times achieved were sometimes modified by a percentage rate, to produce a result known as "Factor Time". It is this time that decided the result of the races, and is listed below. Where this differs from the actual time recorded, actual time is also listed.

Road
Men

Women

Key
AT = actual time
FT = factor time

Track
Men

Women

Key
Q = Qualified for next round
WR = World record
AT = actual time
FT = factor time

Equestrian 

The only equestrian events held in the Paralympic Games are in the Dressage discipline. Five American riders competed, in both individual and team events.

Goalball 

Goalball is a Paralympic sport played by athletes who are blind and visually impaired. At the 2008 Paralympics, the U.S. men's goalball team hoped to repeat their bronze medal performance in Athens, but lost to Sweden in the final. The U.S. women's goalball team improved on their silver medal performance in Athens, defeating China in the gold medal match.

Men

Women

Judo 

Jordan Mouton was selected as the only U.S. representative in the women's division at the 2008 U.S. Paralympic Trials for Judo. All four American men went uncontested at the Trials and were automatically selected for the team. Greg DeWall, a first-time Paralympian, won a bronze medal in the Men's +100 kilogram class.

Powerlifting 

The U.S. powerlifting team consisted of two competitors, Mary Stack and Andy Wise. All of Stack's lifts were declared invalid. She faltered and missed on her first two attempts to lift 110 kg. On her third attempt, Stack managed to lift the weight but the judges did not accept the lift and she was disqualified. Wise completed two valid lifts, the maximum of which was 150 kg, and finished in eleventh place.

Key: NMR=No marks recorded

Rowing

The 2008 U.S. Paralympic Rowing Team was selected after the 2008 U.S. Rowing National Championships in West Windsor, N.J. and was composed of nine athletes. This was the first time rowing has appeared as a medal sport in the Paralympic Games. Laura Schwanger, who has multiple sclerosis and won ten medals in track and field across three Paralympics, battled back from breast cancer treatment to win a bronze medal in women's single sculls at age 49. The U.S. mixed coxed four team rallied in the final 100 m of their 1000 m race to take the silver medal.

Qualification Legend: R=Repechage; FA=Final A (medal); FB=Final B (non-medal)

Sailing 

The United States entered crews in all three of the sailing events, held in the Qingdao International Sailing Centre. Maureen McKinnon-Tucker and Nick Scandone clinched a gold medal in the SKUD-18 class with two races left in the series. First-time Paralympian John Ruf won a bronze medal in a competitive 2.4 mR final race, where the top seven players of the fleet started within single-digit points of each other.

Key
(#) = Worst two results discarded
CAN = Race cancelled
DNS = Did not start
RAF = Retired after finishing

Shooting 

The U.S. sent two athletes (one man and one woman) to compete in the shooting events at the Paralympics.

Swimming

The 2008 U.S. Paralympic Swimming Trials were held on April 3–5 at the University of Minnesota in Minneapolis, Minnesota. A total of 38 swimming athletes (20 male and 18 female) were selected to represent the U.S. at the 2008 Paralympic Games. Melissa Stockwell, a former United States Army officer who lost her left leg to a roadside bomb, became the first Iraq War veteran to be selected for the Paralympics. The roster also included Dave Denniston, an NCAA champion in the 200-yard breast stroke, two-time Olympic hopeful, and world record breaker who was paralyzed in a 2005 sledding accident.

The U.S. Paralympic Swimming Team left Beijing with 17 gold, 14 silver and 13 bronze medals. The total of 44 medals was 9 more than they took home from Athens. Out of the 38 athletes on the team, 19 received a medal. U.S. swimmers set a total of 16 world records, 23 Paralympic records, 48 Pan American records and 99 American records.

Men

*Listed as finishing heats in ninth place, but started the final in place of eighth-place qualifier Rudy Garcia-Tolson
Legend: Q – Qualifiers for the next round as decided on a time only basis. Ranks shown are overall rank against competitors in all heats; WR=World Record; PR=Paralympic Record

Women

Legend: Q – Qualifiers for the next round as decided on a time only basis. Ranks shown are overall rank against competitors in all heats; WR=World Record; PR=Paralympic Record

Table tennis 

The United States sent four athletes (three men and one woman) to compete in Paralympic table tennis.

Men

Women

Volleyball 

The U.S. women's sitting volleyball team upset world number one Netherlands in five sets to reach the gold medal match, where they lost to China for a silver medal. The men's sitting volleyball team failed to qualify for the Paralympics after losing to Brazil at the 2007 Parapan American Games.

Women's sitting volleyball

Wheelchair basketball 

The United States qualified for both men's and women's wheelchair basketball tournaments at the International Wheelchair Basketball Federation qualifying tournaments for the Americas. The men's team finished in fourth place after losing to Great Britain in the bronze final. The women's team successfully defended their 2004 gold medal with a win over Germany.

Men

*Iran withdrew from its quarterfinal match against the United States on September 19, 2008. The match had been rescheduled from 11:15am to 9:00am, but was changed without any logical reason according to the head of Iran's delegation. As a result, the U.S. was awarded the win by the score of 20–0 and automatically advanced to the semi-finals.

Women

Wheelchair fencing 

The United States sent five athletes (four men and one woman) to compete in wheelchair fencing.

Wheelchair rugby 

At the Paralympics teams in the sport of wheelchair rugby are made up of mixed classification quadriplegic athletes of both sexes. The United States qualified by winning the 2006 World Wheelchair Rugby Championships and went on to win its third gold medal since wheelchair rugby was introduced as a demonstration sport at the 1996 Atlanta Paralympics.

Wheelchair tennis 

The American wheelchair tennis team consisted of nine players. Lee Hinson, Paul Moran, Jon Rydberg and Stephen Welch competed in the men's events, Beth Arnoult and Kaitlyn Verfuerth competed in the women's events, and Brent Poppen, Nick Taylor and David Wagner competed in the mixed quadriplegic events. The tennis team was coached by Dan James, with Jason Hartnett as assistant coach, David Schobel as team leader, and Bill Taylor as the personal care assistant. Taylor and Wagner successfully defended their title in mixed doubles, which they had won four years earlier at the 2004 Paralympics. The two men competed against each other in the bronze medal match of the mixed singles event, with Wagner prevailing.

Media coverage
U.S. coverage of the 2008 Paralympic Games was provided by the Universal Sports Television Network. Daily live and delayed highlight shows as well as coverage of the opening and closing ceremonies was available on-demand at UniversalSports.com from September 6–17. Daily video highlights were also available at the official website of the U.S. Paralympic Team, usparalympics.org. The Universal Sports television broadcast began on October 8, followed by seven days of three-hour segments of coverage and a special presentation highlighting the events that was broadcast by NBC on October 18. A 90-minute documentary was presented by NBC on November 9, and was followed by another broadcast of the Games on Universal Sports from November 10–16.

See also
2008 Summer Paralympics
United States at the 2008 Summer Olympics

References

External links
Beijing 2008 Paralympic Games results database
International Paralympic Committee official website
United States Paralympic Committee official website

Nations at the 2008 Summer Paralympics
2008
Paralympics